Areeya Property (PCL.)  was founded in 2000 as a company limited to develop the real estate projects by all project operated in the name of ‘Areeya’..

History 
In year 2003, the company registered as a public company and then its security was listed in the Stock Exchange of Thailand in year 2004.
Areeya Property (PCL.) currently develops a full range of residential projects with 3 product lines
•	Single Detached House project
•	Townhome project
•	Condominium project
Moreover, Areeya Prpperty (PCL.) has initialed to develop the community mall, wholesale building and retail building. In order to build component of residential as well for responding to meet the need of customers who want comprehensive project.

Milestone

3 Business Groups
Areeya Property (PCL.) and its subsidiaries is summarized as the 5 core businesses as follows;
1. Development of real estate project
2. Development of real estate projects and property management
3. After sales service for property
4. Construction service
5. Retail business

References

Stock Exchange of Thailand
http://www.microsoft.com/thailand/casestudy/property/areeya/
https://web.archive.org/web/20160304035201/http://www.trisrating.com/en/areeya-property-plc/3523-areeya130115.html
http://www.settrade.com/C04_03_stock_companyhighlight_p1.jsp?txtSymbol=A&ssoPageId=12&selectPage=3

External links

Real estate companies of Thailand
Real estate companies established in 2000
Companies listed on the Stock Exchange of Thailand
Companies based in Bangkok
Thai companies established in 2000